is a Japanese voice actress and J-Pop singer from Chiba Prefecture, Japan. As the Excel Saga character Mikako Hyatt, she forms one half of the voice acting duo The Excel Girls (the other half being Yumiko Kobayashi). She is employed by I'm Enterprise. She is also the best knowing dubbing roles of Korean drama and films, like for Park Shin-hye, Shin So-yul and others. In January 2017, she wrote in her private blog that she has been married since the last day of 2016.

Filmography

Anime
1999
Space Pirate Mito (1999), Azuki
Aoi & Mutsuki: A Pair of Queens (1999), Azuki
Infinite Ryvius (1999), Kibure Kikki, Lilith Frau
Excel Saga (1999), Mikako Hyatt
2000
Hand Maid May (2000), Kasumi Tani
2001
Strawberry Eggs (2001), Fujio Himejima
Gear Fighter Dendoh (2001), Saki
The Prince of Tennis (2001), Sakuno Ryuuzaki
2002
Aquarian Age: Sign for Evolution (2002), Kaede Morino
Full Metal Panic! (2002), Tomomi Isomura
Samurai Deeper Kyo (2002), Makoto & Mahiro
Gravion (2002), Tuile
2003
L/R: Licensed by Royalty (2003), Noel Adelaide
Popotan (2003), Miyuki
Yami to Bōshi to Hon no Tabibito (2003), Voice of the Letter
Crush Gear Nitro (2003), Natsumi Maeda
Peace Maker Kurogane (2003), Saya, Saizo the Pig
2004
Uta∽Kata (2004), Ai Niwa
Elfen Lied (2004), No. 3
Grenadier (2004), Rushuna Tendo
Gravion Zwei (2004), Tuile
Fullmetal Alchemist (2004), Woman
Gundam Seed Destiny (2004), Kira Yamato (child)
Burst Angel (2004), Amy
Magical Girl Lyrical Nanoha (2004), Chrono Harlaown, Player (ep 3)
Maria Watches Over Us (2004), Chisato Tanuma
Maria Watches Over Us Season 2: Printemps (2004), Chisato Tanuma
Midori Days (2004), Rin (Young)
Rockman.EXE Stream (2004), Romeda Andou
2005
Ichigo 100% (2005), Tomoko
Elemental Gelade (2005), Reverie "Ren" Metherlence
Karin (2005), Maki Tokitou
Canvas 2: Niji Iro no Sketch (2005), Tomoko Fujinami
Honey and Clover (2005), Ayumi Yamada
Magical Girl Lyrical Nanoha A's (2005), Chrono Harlaown
2006
Gintama (2006), Sadaharu, Tsū Terakado
Simoun (2006), Rodoreamon
Girl's High (2006), Mari Saionji
Super Robot Wars OG: Divine Wars (2006), Kusuha Mizuha
The Familiar of Zero (2006), Montmorency
Tactical Roar (2006), Watatsumi Tsubasa
Ghost Slayers Ayashi (2006), Older Sister (ep 1)
Bartender (2006), Mika
Honey and Clover II (2006), Ayumi Yamada
Hanbun no Tsuki ga Noboru Sora (2006-01-12), Rika Akiba
Black Blood Brothers (2006), Hibari Kusunogi
My-Otome (2006), Rosalie Claudel
Mamoru-kun ni Megami no Shukufuku o! (2006), Ayako Takasu
Renkin 3-kyuu Magical? Pokahn (2006), Youko
2007
Idolmaster Xenoglossia (2007), Sorewa Suzuki
Ikki Tousen: Dragon Destiny (2007), Hakugen Rikuson, Teni
Sisters of Wellber (2007), Rita Ciol
Engage Planet Kiss Dum (2007), Miki (eps 9–10)
The Familiar of Zero: Knight of the Twin Moons (2007), Montmorency
Nagasarete Airantou (2007), Machi
Hayate the Combat Butler (2007), Ayumu Nishizawa
Neuro: Supernatural Detective (2007), Ruri Himemiya (ep 2)
Magical Girl Lyrical Nanoha StrikerS (2007), Caro Ru Lushe, Friedrich (baby form)
Rental Magica (2007), Adilicia Ren Mathers
2008
Real Drive (2008), Emi Miaya (eps 12–14)
Ikki Tousen: Great Guardians (2008), Hakugen Rikuson
Sisters of Wellber Zwei (2008), Rita Sior
Glass Maiden (2008), Ayaka
Kemeko Deluxe! (2008), Izumi Makihara
Kure-nai (2008), Kirihiko Kirishima
The Familiar of Zero: Rondo of Princesses (2008), Montmorency
Birdy the Mighty: Decode (2008), Hazumi Senkawa
To Love-Ru (2008), Akiho Sairenji
Someday's Dreamers II Sora (2008), Hiyori Yamabuki
Mōryō no Hako (2008), Yoriko Kusumoto
Our Home's Fox Deity (2008), Gyokuyou (female)
2009
Aoi Bungaku Series (2009), Melos' Sister
Kanamemo (2009), Kanamemo
Queen's Blade: The Exiled Virgin (2009), Nowa
Queen's Blade 2: The Evil Eye (2009), Nowa
The Beast Player Erin (2009), Semiya
Chrome Shelled Regios (2009), Leerin Marfes
Shangri-La (2009), Kuniko Houjou
The Sacred Blacksmith (2009), Penelope
The Girl Who Leapt Through Space (2009), Madoka
Birdy the Mighty Decode:02 (2009), Hazumi Senkawa
Hayate the Combat Butler!! (2009), Ayumu Nishizawa
Maria Watches Over Us 4th Season (2009), Chisato Tanuma (ep 12)
2010
Ikki Tousen: Xtreme Xecutor (2010), Ten'i, Hakugen Rikuson
Ōkami-san & Her Seven Companions (2010), Ami Jizō (eps 7–8)
Super Robot Wars OG: The Inspector (2010), Kusuha Mizuha
The Legend of the Legendary Heroes (2010), Noa Ehn
Motto To Love Ru (2010), Akiho Sairenji
2011
Gintama' (2011), Sadaharu
The Mystic Archives of Dantalian (2011), Boy A (ep 3)
Chibi Devi! (2011), Rai
Dog Days (2011), Rebecca Anderson
Battle Spirits: Heroes (2011), Mika Kisaragi
Aria the Scarlet Ammo (2011), Shirayuki Hotogi
Dream Eater Merry (2011), Cat Nurse A (ep 6), Serio (ep 2)
2012
Accel World (2012), Chrome Disaster (ep 12)
Girls und Panzer (2012), Yuzu Koyama
The Pet Girl of Sakurasou (2012), Koharu Shirayama
Shakugan no Shana III (2012), Westshore
The Familiar of Zero F (2012), Montmorency
Tanken Driland (2012), Bayonet Wielder Gina
Muv-Luv Alternative: Total Eclipse (2012), Kai Shimako
Dog Days' (2012), Rebecca Anderson
Hayate the Combat Butler: Can't Take My Eyes Off You (2012), Ayumu Nishizawa
Hunter × Hunter (2011) (2012), Eeta, Elena, Greed Island Auctioneer
2013
Kiniro Mosaic (2013), Shinobu's mother (eps 1–12)
Kotoura-san (2013), Muroto's mother (ep 8)
Servant × Service (2013), Tanaka-san
Hayate the Combat Butler! Cuties (2013), Ayumu Nishizawa
2014
Girl Friend BETA (2014), Shiori Shiratori
Strike the Blood (2014), Aya Tokoyogi/Lee Blue (eps 15–19)
SoniAni: Super Sonico the Animation (2014), Satsuki Imori (ep 7)
D-Frag! (2014), Sakura Mizukami
Future Card Buddyfight (2014), Suzuha Amanosuzu
Magical Warfare (2014), Momoka Shijō
Lady Jewelpet (2014), Lady Elena
2015
Gintama (2015), Sadaharu, Sekitobaharu
Shokugeki no Soma (2015), Jun Shiomi
Tantei Kageki Milky Holmes TD (2015), Masako Orishimo (ep 4)
[[Dog Days (Japanese TV series)|Dog Days]] (2015), Rebecca AndersonTo Love Ru: Darkness (2015), Akiho SairenjiAria the Scarlet Ammo Double A (2015), Shirayuki HotogiMagical Girl Lyrical Nanoha ViVid (2015), Caro Ru Lushe, Friedrich (baby form)
2016Dimension W (2016), Sophia (ep 9)Haven't You Heard? I'm Sakamoto (2016), ErikaFūka (2017), Maya Haruna
2018
 High School DxD Hero, Venelana Gremory
 Idolish7, Yoshimi
 March Comes In like a Lion, Mikako Kawamoto
2019
 Detective Conan, Kaho Mizunuma
 Domestic Girlfriend, Ayano
2020
 Fruits Basket: 2nd season, Satsuki Sohma
2021
 Tropical-Rouge! Pretty Cure, Narumi Ichinose

Animated filmsMagical Girl Lyrical Nanoha The Movie 1st (2010-01-23), Chrono HarlaownHayate the Combat Butler! Heaven Is a Place on Earth (2011-08-27), Ayumu NishizawaMagical Girl Lyrical Nanoha The Movie 2nd A's (2012-07-14), Chrono HarlaownGintama: The Movie: The Final Chapter: Be Forever Yorozuya (2013-07-06), SadaharuGirls und Panzer der Film (2015-11-21), Yuzu Koyama
 Girls und Panzer das Finale: Part 1 (2017), Yuzu KoyamaMagical Girl Lyrical Nanoha Reflection (2017), Chrono HarlaownMagical Girl Lyrical Nanoha Detonation (2018), Chrono Harlaown
 Girls und Panzer das Finale: Part 2 (2019), Yuzu Koyama
 Girls und Panzer das Finale: Part 3 (2021), Yuzu Koyama

Drama CDHand Maid May Non Scramble CD Drama (2000-09-21), Kasumi Tani

Video gamesArcana Heart series as Heart AinoSuper Heroine Chronicle (2014) as Shirayuki Hotogi
Granblue Fantasy as Maria Theresa
Arknights as Tomimi

Dubbing
Park Shin-hyeDoctor Crush as Yoo Hye-jungFlower Boys Next Door as Go Dok-miThe Heirs as Cha Eun-sangPinocchio as Choi In-haYou're Beautiful as Ko Mi-nyeo/Gemma and Ko Mi-namYou've Fallen for Me as Lee Gyu-won
Shin So-yulPenny Pinchers as Ha Kyung-jooWhatcha Wearin'? as So-yeonCloud Atlas as Sonmi-451 (Doona Bae)Mother, May I Sleep with Danger? as Leah LewisohnSilenced as Seo Yoo-jin (Jung Yu-mi)Twelve Men in a Year as Oh Hae-ra (Bae Geu-rin)

Live-action filmsGintama, Sadaharu (voice)

References

 Taniguchi, Hiroshi et al. "The Official Art of Canvas2 ~Nijiiro no Sketch~". (November 2006) Newtype USA''. pp. 101–107.

External links
 
Official website at Victor Entertainment 
Mikako Takahashi at GamePlaza-Haruka Voice Acting Database 
Mikako Takahashi at the Seiyuu database

1980 births
Living people
I'm Enterprise voice actors
Japanese video game actresses
Japanese voice actresses
Musicians from Chiba Prefecture
Voice actresses from Chiba Prefecture
21st-century Japanese women singers
21st-century Japanese singers